The Garden, Ikoyi is an urban green space located along Alfred Rewane Road, Ikoyi, Lagos. This garden was unveiled in November 2022 and is maintained by an organization called RF Gardens that specializes in landscape design and production, flower arrangements, and sales of plants and flowers. The garden has seats, an outdoor space for minimal recreation, small gatherings, sales of victuals, an indoor lounge, and an office complex. Access into this garden is free.

Gallery

References 

Gardens in Lagos